Dennis A. Muilenburg (born 1964) is an American engineer, business executive, and the former president and chief executive officer (CEO) of The Boeing Company, a multinational aerospace and defense company. He was CEO from 2015 to 2019, when he was fired in the aftermath of two crashes of the 737 MAX and its subsequent groundings.

Muilenburg was elected a member of the National Academy of Engineering in 2018 for leadership in defense, space, security, and commercial aircraft.

Early life and education
Muilenburg grew up on a farm in Iowa.

He graduated in 1982 from Sioux Center High School in Sioux Center, Iowa.  He received a bachelor's degree in Aerospace Engineering from Iowa State University, followed by a master's degree in Aeronautics and Astronautics from the University of Washington.

Career 
Muilenburg started work at Boeing as an intern in 1985.

Muilenburg held numerous management and engineering positions on various Boeing programs, including the X-32 (Boeing's entry in the Joint Strike Fighter competition); Boeing's participation in the Lockheed Martin F-22 Raptor fighter; the YAL-1 747 Airborne Laser; the High Speed Civil Transport; and the Condor unmanned reconnaissance aircraft. He was later vice president of the Boeing combat systems division and program manager for the Army Future Combat Systems program. Muilenburg was president and chief executive officer of Boeing Integrated Defense Systems, later renamed Boeing Defense, Space & Security (BDS), from September 2009 to 2015.

In December 2013, Muilenburg became the president of Boeing.

In June 2015, Boeing announced that Muilenburg would succeed James McNerney as CEO, who was stepping down after ten years in that role.  He became CEO in July 2015.

In February 2016, it was announced that Muilenburg would also succeed McNerney as Boeing's chairman. In March 2016, Muilenburg became the chairman of the board of directors of Boeing.
In 2018, Muilenburg agreed to a fixed-price contract to deliver two customized 747 planes to the U.S. government which left Boeing with billions in losses.
In March 2019, as a result of the Ethiopian Airlines Flight 302 crash and the Lion Air Flight 610 crash, which occurred five months prior to the Ethiopian crash, most airlines and countries began grounding the Boeing 737 MAX 8 due to safety concerns. On March 12, President Donald Trump spoke to Muilenburg and received assurances that the aircraft was safe. Trump grounded the 737 MAX family of planes on March 13.

In October 2019, Boeing announced that the board had voted to separate the roles of chairman and CEO, both of which were held by Muilenburg. David L. Calhoun was elected to take over as non-executive chairman, while Muilenburg continued as CEO and president. The company said this change would enable Muilenburg to focus full-time on running the company, while it worked to return the Boeing 737 MAX to service.

In November 2019, Muilenburg confirmed that he would not be taking a bonus for the year, after being criticized for the two plane crashes, which killed a total of 346 people.

On December 23, 2019, Boeing announced that Muilenburg resigned as the CEO and board director, in the aftermath of the two crashes of 737 MAX aircraft. Although he forfeited stock worth $14.6m, Muilenburg was contractually entitled to receive $62.2m in stock and pension awards.

This payment by Boeing attracted criticism. Michael Stumo who lost his daughter in the Ethiopian Airlines crash said, 'He was fired for poor performance, and he should be treated like any other production employee who gets fired for poor performance.' Zipporah Kuria lost her father Joseph and said, 'Nobody gets their benefits when they’ve screwed up this much. Muilenburg and my dad are, were, the same age. Two people, and one is a privileged person who gets away with having such a big part to play in the death of so many people, and the other who trusts a product and dies for it.' US Senator Elizabeth Warren wrote regarding the payment by Boeing, '346 people died. And yet, Dennis Muilenburg pressured regulators and put profits ahead of the safety of passengers, pilots, and flight attendants. He'll walk away with an additional $62.2 million. This is corruption, plain and simple.' 

He was succeeded as CEO and president by current chairman David L. Calhoun, effective January 13, 2020. The current CFO, Greg Smith, will serve as interim CEO during the transition. Boeing's press release stated that, "The Board of Directors decided that a change in leadership was necessary to restore confidence in the Company moving forward as it works to repair relationships with regulators, customers, and all other stakeholders."

In January 2020, Caterpillar Inc. announced that Muilenburg had resigned from its board (which he joined in 2011), and stated  in a regulatory filing that his resignation was not due to any disagreement with the company.

Memberships 

Board memberships
Current
 Trustee, The National WWII Museum
 Trustee, Northwestern University
 Board member, US-China Business Council

Previous

 Board member, Caterpillar Inc.
 Board member, The Boeing Company, until he resigned on December 23, 2019, as President, CEO and board member in the aftermath of the 737 Max crashes
 Chairman of the board, The Boeing Company
 Vice-chairman of the board, The Boeing Company
 Chairman of the board, Aerospace Industries Association
 Trustee, Washington University
Board member, Aerospace Industries Association

Other memberships

 Member, Business Roundtable
 Member, Association of the United States Army
 Member, National Space Council Users Advisory Group
 Member, National Academy of Engineering

Personal life
Muilenburg cycles about 120 miles per week around the Chicago area, where Boeing is headquartered.

Muilenburg is a Baptist and has spoken about managing overall life.

Awards 

 Fellow, Royal Aeronautical Society
 Honorary Fellow, American Institute of Aeronautics and Astronautics
 John W. Dixon Award (2017), Association of the United States Army
 CEO of the Year Award (2018), Thurgood Marshall College Fund
 Dean's Award (2018), University of Washington College of Engineering
 Person of the Year (2018), Aviation Week

References

Further reading

External links 
 
 

1964 births
Living people
American chief executives of manufacturing companies
Chairmen of Boeing
Boeing people
Iowa State University alumni
University of Washington College of Engineering alumni
People from Orange City, Iowa